Andrew James Tiernan (born 30 November 1965) is a British actor and director.

Biography

Theatre
Tiernan began acting with the Birmingham Youth Theatre and moved to London in 1984 to study a three-year diploma in acting at the Drama Centre London run by Christopher Fettes and Yat Malmgren. His theatre work has included Joe Penhall's The Bullet at the Donmar Warehouse, and a long-term collaboration with the Tony-nominated director Wilson Milam, including Ché Walker's Flesh Wound at the Royal Court Theatre and two critically acclaimed productions of Sam Shepard's plays: A Lie of the Mind at the Donmar Warehouse and True West at the Bristol Old Vic. In 2008, Tiernan returned to the theatre in Dorota Maslowska's A Couple of Poor, Polish-Speaking Romanians at the Soho Theatre.

Film
Tiernan played Piers Gaveston in Derek Jarman's controversial film of Christopher Marlowe's Edward II in 1991, after appearing in Lynda La Plante's award-winning drama Prime Suspect. In the same year, he went on to star as Orlando and Oliver in Christine Edzard's version of Shakespeare's As You Like It playing alongside actors James Fox and Cyril Cusack. He then went on to star in the 2001 thriller, Mr In-Between, directed by Paul Sarossy.

He played Szalas in Roman Polanski's film The Pianist. He worked with Antonia Bird on a number of improvisational film productions, including Safe (Bafta - Best single drama), Face, Rehab and Spooks.

Tiernan starred in Zack Snyder's 300, an adaptation of the Frank Miller graphic novel, in which he portrayed Ephialtes of Trachis. Filming took place from October 2005 to January 2006 in Montreal. To portray Ephialtes, Tiernan dressed in full body prosthetics which took 10 hours each day to complete. He portrayed the character again in the sequel 300: Rise of an Empire (2014).

He appeared as Captain Martin Stone in Marko Mäkilaakso's Stone's War.

TV
In 1993, Tiernan appeared in the series Cracker in the episode "To Say I Love You". In 1997 played Banquo in the Shakespeare adaptation for BBC (MacBeth on the Estate) alongside James Frain and Susan Vidler. In 1998, in the British TV series Hornblower, he played Bunting in the second episode, "The Examination For Lieutenant". Other credits in television include Victor Carroon in The Quatermass Experiment, Kim Trent in Life on Mars and Lenny Spearfish in the BBC TV series Jonathan Creek in "The Curious Tale of Mr Spearfish" (1999). In 2005, he played Ben Jonson in A Waste of Shame, a William Shakespeare biopic presented as part of the BBC's ShakespeaRe-Told series. He appeared in an episode of crime drama Midsomer Murders as Steve Bright, a photography enthusiast who is strangled with his own camera strap and in Dalziel & Pascoe as a lottery winner in the two-part episodes "Fallen Angel". In 2012, he appeared as DS Hunter in BBC's new drama Prisoners' Wives.

Directing
In 2015, Tiernan made his directorial debut with the feature film Dragonfly, followed in 2017 by UK18, and in 2019 by Break Clause.

Filmography

References

External links

1965 births
Alumni of the Drama Centre London
English male film actors
English male television actors
English people of Irish descent
Living people
People from Birmingham, West Midlands
20th-century English male actors
21st-century English male actors